Brihaspa atrostigmella is a moth in the family Crambidae. It was described by Frederic Moore in 1867. It is found in India (Sikkim), Myanmar, China (Guangdong, Guangxi, Yunnan), Bhutan, Bangladesh, Vietnam and Thailand.

Subspecies
Brihaspa atrostigmella atrostigmella
Brihaspa atrostigmella sinensis Caradja, 1933

References

Moths described in 1867
Schoenobiinae